Paul Jerima (born Jefimow, also known as Jefimoff, 29 December 1892 – 30 August 1954) was a Finnish footballer, sprinter and graphic designer.

Life

Sports career 
Jerima won the 100 m and 200 m Finnish Championship in 1913, 1914 and 1915, but was later stripped of the titles as he held the Russian citizenship. After granted with the Finnish citizenship, Jerima won the 1919 Championship titles on 4 × 100 m and 4 × 400 m relays representing HIFK.

Jerima played football for HIFK Helsinki and Sport Helsinki. In 1911, he was a member of the Finland squad in their first international scoring Finland's second goal on the 5–2 loss against Sweden.

Illustrator 
Jerima studied at the Academy of Fine Arts and the University of Art and Design. Since 1918, he worked as a graphic designer for the printing company Öflund & Petterson which was soon merged with Tilgmann. In 1931, Jerima was named as Tilgmann's art director and 1945 the vice director. As an illustrator, Jerima is best known of his Christmas cards signed with the initials ″JEF″.

References 

1892 births
1954 deaths
Sportspeople from Helsinki
Finnish people of Russian descent
Finland international footballers
Association football forwards
HIFK Fotboll players
Finnish male sprinters
Finnish illustrators
Finnish graphic designers
Finnish footballers
Naturalized citizens of Finland